Eric Baumann (born 21 March 1980 in Rostock) is a German professional road bicycle racer for Team NetApp in 2010 and used to ride for the UCI Continental team Team Sparkasse. He secured a contract with T-Mobile Team in 2004, having turned professional with Team Wiesenhof in 2003 and before that riding as amateur for Team Köstritzer.

He lives in Leipzig.

Palmares 

2000
 Paris–Roubaix (U23)
2001
 European Championships (U23)
2002
 German Champion (U23)
2003
 Tour of Solidarnosc stage 2
2005
 Tour de Luxembourg stage 1
2008
 Sparkassen Giro Bochum

External links 
 

1980 births
Living people
German male cyclists
Sportspeople from Rostock
People from Bezirk Rostock
Cyclists from Mecklenburg-Western Pomerania